Jidava was a fort in the Roman province of Dacia.

Since 1969, the site has been administered by the Argeș County Museum.

Gallery

See also
List of castra

Notes

External links

Roman castra from Romania - Google Maps / Earth 

Roman Dacia
Archaeological sites in Romania
Roman legionary fortresses in Romania
History of Muntenia
Câmpulung
Historic monuments in Argeș County